Bartłomiej Pękiel (fl. from 1633; d. ca. 1670) was a  Polish composer of baroque music.

Biography
The writer and composer Johann Mattheson claimed that the composer was German and his name is sometimes recorded as "Peckel". Pękiel served the court in Warsaw from about 1633. After the Swedish invasion of Poland in 1655 he then moved to Wawel Cathedral Chapel in Kraków, where he was Kapellmeister after the death of Franciszek Lilius in 1657. After 1664 there are few references to him; the next Kapellmeister was appointed in 1670.

29 of Pękiel's works survive, mostly in manuscript. He wrote the only Polish church  oratorio , on the topic of The Last Judgement.

Works

Choral
  (CATB)
  (ATTB)
  (ATTB)
  (CATB + CATB)
 
  (ATTB)
  (ATTB)
  (ATTB)
 . Motet (ATTB)
 . Motet (ATTB)
 . Motet (ATTB)
 . Motet (CATB)
 . Motet (CATB)
 . Motet (CATB)
 . Motet, (ATTB)
 . Motet, (ATTB)
 , Motet, (ATTB)
 . Motet (ATTB)

Instrumental
   (for 3 viole da gamba, six voices and basso continuo)
  ("Three Polish Dances"): Uroczysty (moderato) - Dostojny (andante]]) - Wesoły (allegro)
  (for five voices and basso continuo)

Notable recordings
 Bartłomiej Pękiel, The Sixteen, COR16110, June 2013

References

Year of birth missing
1670s deaths
Polish Baroque composers
Polish classical composers
Polish male classical composers
17th-century classical composers
17th-century male musicians